is a railway station on the Hōhi Main Line, operated by JR Kyushu in Kita-ku, Kumamoto, Japan.

Lines

Layout 
The station consists of an island platform serving two tracks at grade. The station building is a Japanese style wooden structure with a red tile roof. It houses a waiting area and a staffed ticket window. Access to the island platform is by means of a level crossing. To the south of the station, beyond platform 2, is a disused siding.

Management of the station has been outsourced to the JR Kyushu Tetsudou Eigyou Co., a wholly owned subsidiary of JR Kyushu specialising in station services. It staffs the ticket booth which is equipped with a POS machine but does not have a Midori no Madoguchi facility.

Adjacent stations

History
On the same day, this station was opened as one of several intermediate stations along the track. On 2 December 1928, the entire track from Kumamoto to Ōita was designated as the Hōhi Main Line. With the privatization of Japanese National Railways (JNR), the successor of JGR, on 1 April 1987, the station came under the control of JR Kyushu.

Passenger statistics
In fiscal 2016, the station was used by an average of 677 passengers daily (boarding passengers only), and it ranked 207th among the busiest stations of JR Kyushu.

See also
List of railway stations in Japan

References

External links
Tatsutaguchi (JR Kyushu)

Railway stations in Kumamoto Prefecture
Railway stations in Japan opened in 1914